The 2012 Euro Beach Soccer League (EBSL) is an annual European competition in beach soccer, organised by Beach Soccer Worldwide (BSWW). The competitions allows national teams to compete in beach soccer in a league format over the summer months. Each season ends with a Superfinal, deciding the competition winner.

This season, there are eight teams participating in two divisions in each Stage (there are three Stages this year, as opposed to four) that will face each other in a round-robin system. Division A consists of the 8 top teams in Europe based on the BSWW European Ranking. Division B consists of 12 of the lower ranked teams and new entries to the competition. Each division has its own regulations and competition format. This was due to the European qualifying tournament for the 2013 FIFA Beach Soccer World Cup being held during the EBSL season.

Each team competes in two preliminary events to see their points obtained accumulated into an overall ranking that will determine the teams that qualify for the Superfinal. The top six teams of Division A (including the individual Stage winners) will play in the Superfinal in The Hague, the Netherlands from August 23 – 26.  The top four teams of Division B (including the individual Stage winners) plus the worst team in Division A and the host team Netherlands will play in the Promotional Final to try to earn promotion to Division A for the 2013 season.

Beginning this season, the Power Horse energy drink company has signed on to become the new sponsor of the EBSL. The logo has been slightly modified to show this.

Eligible EBSL teams

The teams from Division A will compete for the Euro Beach Soccer League title while the teams from Division B will compete for promotion into next year's Division A.

Note: Netherlands qualifies for Promotion Final as host nation without playing a match.

Stage 1 Terracina, Italy – June, 8 – 10

Participating nations

Final standings

Division A, Group A

Division A, Group B

Division B

Belarus win the stage on goal average

Schedule and results
All kickoff times are of local time in Terracina (UTC+02:00).

Individual awards
MVP:  Paolo Palmacci 
Top Scorer:  Paolo Palmacci (8 goals) 
Best goalkeeper:  Andrey Bukhlitskiy

Stage 2 Berlin, Germany – August, 3 – 5

Participating nations

Final standings Division A

Final standings Division B

Schedule and results
All kickoff times are of local time in Berlin (UTC+02:00).

Individual awards
MVP:   Dmitry Shishin
Top Scorer:   Dmitry Shishin (7 goals)
Best goalkeeper:  Danila Ippolitov

Stage 3 Torredembarra, Spain – August, 17 – 19

Participating nations

Final standings Division A

Final standings Division B

Schedule and results
All kickoff times are of local time in Torredembarra  (UTC+02:00).

Individual awards
MVP:   Llorenç Gómez 
Top Scorer:   Llorenç Gómez (7 goals)
Best goalkeeper:   Paulo Graça

Cumulative standings

Ranking & tie-breaking criteria: Division A – 1. Points earned 2. Goal difference 3. Goals scored | Division B – 1. Points earned 2. Highest stage placement 3. Goal difference 4. Goals scored.

Division A

Division B

EBSL Superfinal and Promotional Final – The Hague, Netherlands – August, 23 – 26

Superfinal and Promotional Final Divisions

The Divisions for the Euro Beach Soccer League Superfinal have not yet been determined. The teams from Division A will compete for the Euro Beach Soccer League title while the teams from Division B will compete for promotion into next year's Division A.

Division A (Superfinal)

Group a standings

Group b standings

Schedule and results
All kickoff times are of local time in The Hague (UTC+02:00).

Round-Robin

Fifth-place Match

Third-place Match

Championship final Match

Individual awards
MVP:   Dmitry Shishin 
Top Scorer:   Dejan Stankovic (7 goals)
Best goalkeeper:   Valentin Jaeggy

Final Division A Standing

Division B (Promotional Final)

Group a standings

Group b standings

Schedule and results
All kickoff times are of local time in The Hague (UTC+02:00).

Round-Robin

Fifth-place Match

Third-place Match

Championship final Match

Final Division B Standing

BSWW increased the number of participating teams in Division A from eight to twelve in 2013, meaning five nations, rather than the usual one, were promoted at the end of this season.

See also
 Beach soccer
 Euro Beach Soccer League

References

External links
 Highlights of the Euro Beach Soccer League Superfinal
 Beach Soccer Worldwide
 Eurosport TV
 Power Horse Energy Drink, the official EBSL sponsor

Euro Beach Soccer League
2012 in beach soccer